Virginia Ruano Pascual and Paola Suárez were the defending champions, but none competed this year. Ruano Pascual decided to focus on the singles tournament, while Suárez decided to rest after competing in the World Group Play-offs of the Fed Cup.

Joannette Kruger and Francesca Schiavone won the title by defeating Yuliya Beygelzimer and Anastasia Rodionova 6–4, 6–0 in the final.

This tournament saw an unusual event, as all seeded pairs were eliminated in the first round.

Seeds

Draw

Draw

References
 Official Results Archive (ITF)
 Official Results Archive (WTA)

Women's Doubles
Doubles